Starotolucheyevo is a rural locality (a selo) in Podkolodnovskoye Rural Settlement, Bogucharsky District, Voronezh Oblast, Russia. The population was 375 as of 2010. There are 10 streets.

Geography 
Starotolucheyevo is located on the Tolucheyevka River, 20 km northeast of Boguchar (the district's administrative centre) by road. Podkolodnovka is the nearest rural locality.

References 

Rural localities in Bogucharsky District